Musik-Konzepte is a quarterly series of German language musicology texts founded in 1977 by Heinz-Klaus Metzger and Rainer Riehn and dedicated to the avant-garde in music of all epochs. Since 2004 it has been edited by Ulrich Tadday.

History 

Musik-Konzepte has been published by edition text + kritik from its founding in 1977. It was edited by Heinz-Klaus Metzger and Rainer Riehn (volumes 1–122) until the contract was terminated by the publisher as of December 31, 2003. They now edit a similarly named series, querstand. musikalische konzepte

Since January 2004, the musicologist Ulrich Tadday has edited Musik-Konzepte. The first volume edited by him (# 123) deals with the composer Charles Ives. In 1983, the editors were awarded the Deutscher Kritikerpreis (German Critics' Award).

Content 

Based on Theodor W. Adorno's theory of the aesthetics of music, Musik-Konzepte has dedicated itself to composers not only considered to be progressive by the editors, in every era. The series combines musical tradition and innovation, historical and contemporary. Musik-Konzepte deals with either a composer and his work or a theme that is considered important from a musical, aesthetic, historical or sociologically perspective. For instance, volume 74 Musik und Traum (1991). The series is targeted to not only musicologists savvy, but also at a general readership of those with an interest in music.

Publication 

Musik-Konzepte is published quarterly, with volumes available either individually or by a discounted subscription which includes the additional annual special edition volume at a reduced price. Students are offered a discounted subscription.

Volumes

References

External links 

 Musik-Konzepte at goodreads

Music magazines published in Germany
Music theory
Music criticism